Anne Clutterbuck is an attorney and former elected official living in Houston, Texas.  She is a member of the board of managers of the Harris County Hospital District (also known as the Harris Health System), the governing body that oversees the public health system in the Harris County, Texas region.

Clutterbuck was elected to three terms on Houston City Council, where she served from January 2006 through 2011, when she was term limited. While on city council, she served as chair of the Budget & Fiscal Affairs Committee and as mayor pro tempore. She also represented the City of Houston as a director of the Houston-Galveston Area Council (H-GAC), where she was the vice chair of the Budget Committee and the Legislative Affairs Committee and chair of the Audit Committee.

Education and professional career
Clutterbuck grew up in Memorial in west Houston. Her mother, Mary Doherty Uhrbrock, was a journalist for Parents Magazine and Birds Eye Foods. Her father, Donald Uhrbrock, was a photographer for Life Magazine, capturing historical moments that included the early Civil Rights Movement, reclusive To Kill a Mockingbird author Harper Lee, and the NASA human spaceflight program.

Clutterbuck attended Bunker Hill Elementary School, Spring Branch Junior High School, and Memorial High School (Hedwig Village, Texas).  She graduated with a B.A. from Baylor University, and after two years in Washington D.C., she went on to earn a Juris Doctor degree from the University of Houston Law Center.

She has worked many years for the community both as a volunteer as well as in public service. Clutterbuck has worked on federal legislative issues, including seven years as the District Director for Congressman William Reynolds Archer Jr., where her duties included overseeing constituent services and flood control issues for Texas's 7th congressional district.  Clutterbuck was an active volunteer in her neighborhood Civic Club where she served as president for two years. Until 1989, she was a part owner of 5-P Photographic Processing, a professional photographic processing plant in the region.

Political career

Clutterbuck served as the president of the Southampton Civic Club for two years in 2004-5.

In 2005, Clutterbuck ran for Houston City Council District C, a seat held by term limited Mark Goldberg. In a seven-candidate District C race, Clutterbuck received nearly 5,000 votes, solidifying a spot in the December run off election. In December 2005, Clutterbuck won the Houston City Council District C race by over 58% of the vote, and has since been re-elected to a second and third term.

Since taking office in 2005, Clutterbuck has pledged to serve as a full-time advocate for the needs and interests of the residents of District C. At the beginning of January 2008, Mayor Bill White announced that Council Member Clutterbuck would serve as chair of the Budget & Fiscal Affairs Committee and the Ethics Committee. The Budget & Fiscal Affairs Committee considers all fiscal matters and proposals to improve management and efficiency of the delivery City services. The committee reviews the annual budget and Monthly Financial & Operations Report, the Quarterly Investment Report, strategic purchasing, competitive bidding, and customer service concerns. 

Houston City Council voted in January 2008 to have Clutterbuck serve as a representative for the City of Houston on the board of directors of the Houston-Galveston Area Council (H-GAC). H-GAC is a 13-county regional consortium that works on finding solutions to issues affecting our collective areas, this includes: transportation, air quality, community and environmental issues, public safety and security, human services, cooperative purchasing and regional data and geographic information system (GIS) services.

On January 4, 2010, Clutterbuck was appointed by Mayor Annise Parker to be the City's new mayor pro tempore. The appointment was unanimously approved by city council in its first meeting. The mayor pro tem position was vacated by former Council Member Adrian Garcia after his election to Harris County Sheriff. Council Member Sue Lovell was acting mayor pro tem until Clutterbuck’s appointment.

Following the completion of her third term at the end of December 2011, Clutterbuck retired from city council as required by the Houston city charter's term limits provision.

Committee assignments
 Houston City Council Committee on Budget and Fiscal Affairs
 Houston City Council Committee on Development and Regulatory Affairs
 Houston City Council Committee on Ethics and Council Governance
 Houston City Council Committee on Flooding and Drainage
 Houston City Council Committee on Neighborhood Protection and Quality of Life
 Houston City Council Committee on Public Safety and Homeland Security

Personal life
She and her husband, John Clutterbuck, have two children.

Clutterbuck is a trustee on the board of trustees of the Holocaust Museum Houston  and the Upper Kirby District Foundation. She is on the Advisory Committee of the board of the Theatre Under the Stars.

Electoral history

2005

2007

2009

External links

 Houston INTOWN Magazine Anne Clutterbuck Cover

References

Politicians from Atlanta
Baylor University alumni
University of Houston alumni
Houston City Council members
Living people
1961 births
Women city councillors in Texas
21st-century American women